Kevin from Work is an American sitcom that aired on ABC Family from August 12 to October 7, 2015. The pilot was ordered on January 6, 2015 and picked up to series on March 24, 2015.

On March 4, 2016, Kevin from Work was officially cancelled after one season.

Cast

Main characters
 Noah Reid as Kevin Reese Daly, an employee of a major food distribution company Superior Foods & Beverages. He's in love with his co-worker Audrey and reveals this in a letter to her shortly before beginning a job at a new company in Italy. At the last minute, his new company cancels on him, forcing him to return working for Superior. 
 Paige Spara as Audrey Piatigorsky, who works next to Kevin at the office. They became quick friends when he started three years prior to the events of the pilot but he was unable to reveal his feelings for her because she has been in a relationship with her boyfriend Brock, a martial artist, since college. 
 Jordan Hinson as Roxie Daly, Kevin's little sister who left home to live in Los Angeles. Kevin wanted to leave her his apartment after getting the Italy job offer, but is now forced to live with her after it fell through.
 Matt Murray as Brian, Kevin's best friend and a fitness coach at a local gym.
 Punam Patel as Patti, Audrey's roommate who is stalking Kevin after he slept with her in an attempt to get back the letter he sent to Audrey.

Recurring characters
 Jason Rogel as Ricky, a gossiping co-worker of Kevin and Audrey who writes a gossip column in the company's newsletter.
 Amy Sedaris as Julia, Kevin and Audrey's boss at Superior Foods & Beverages. Julia is hinted to be using sex to get what she wants and regularly sleeping with her employees.
 Nik Dodani as Paul Garfunkel and Bryan Coffee as Simon, two co-workers of Kevin's who call themselves "Hall & Oates" (because Simon paces the halls and Paul likes to eat dry oats).
 Brian George as Samir, lawyer and Pattis father who is dating Julia.
 Matthew Florida as Brock, Audrey's martial artist boyfriend.
 Neal Dandade as Dr. Dev, Patti's boyfriend who is a club DJ and a doctor.

Cameo
 Fred Willard as Roger Trousdale, a television star

Episodes

Reception

On Rotten Tomatoes, the series has an aggregated score of 55% based on 6 positive and 5 negative critic reviews.  The website consensus reads: "Kevin from Work relies on raunchy jokes delivered by unsavory characters, but the show's gags hit their targets often enough to elevate a rather routine premise."

References

External links 
 
 
 Website

2010s American sitcoms
2010s American workplace comedy television series
2015 American television series debuts
2015 American television series endings
ABC Family original programming
English-language television shows
Television series by Disney–ABC Domestic Television
Television series by Wonderland Sound and Vision
Television shows set in Los Angeles
Television series by Kapital Entertainment